Bank Hall railway station is a railway station in Kirkdale, Liverpool, England, located to the north of the city centre, on the Northern Line of the Merseyrail network. As the area around the station is made up of largely closed industrial buildings, the station is one of the quietest on the Northern Line.

History
Bank Hall opened in 1850 as an intermediate station when the Liverpool, Crosby and Southport Railway was extended from its previous terminal at Waterloo to Liverpool Exchange. It became part of the Lancashire and Yorkshire Railway (LYR), on 14 June 1855. The Lancashire and Yorkshire Railway amalgamated with the London and North Western Railway on 1 January 1922 and in turn was Grouped into the London, Midland and Scottish Railway in 1923. Nationalisation followed in 1948 and in 1978 the station became part of the Merseyrail network's Northern Line (operated by British Rail until privatisation in 1995).  Only one of the two island platforms located here is still in use - the other remains but has no track and is heavily overgrown.

Facilities
The station's ticket office is staffed during the hours the station is open (from 05:45 on weekdays, 08:00 Sundays until end of service shortly after midnight).  There is a shelter on the platform and digital display screens, but no step-free access from the booking hall down to the platform.

Services
Trains operate every 15 minutes throughout the day from Monday to Saturday (and on summer Sundays) to Southport to the north, and to Hunts Cross via Liverpool Central to the south. Alternate trains terminate at Liverpool Central southbound on Sundays in summer. Winter Sunday services are every 30 minutes in each direction.

Gallery

References

External links

Railway stations in Liverpool
DfT Category E stations
Former Lancashire and Yorkshire Railway stations
Railway stations served by Merseyrail
Railway stations in Great Britain opened in 1850